The EMD GP39 is a 4-axle diesel-electric locomotive built by General Motors Electro-Motive Division between June 1969 and July 1970. The GP39 was a derivative of the GP38 equipped with a turbocharged EMD 645E3 12-cylinder engine which generated .

23 examples of this locomotive model were built for American railroads.

Burlington Northern Railway later rebuilt GP30 and GP35 locomotives that it classified as GP39s, but they were not built as such by GM/EMD.

Production History 
Twenty of the original 23 were built for the Chesapeake and Ohio Railway, while the other buyers were Kennecott Copper (2) and Atlanta & St. Andrews Bay (1).

GP39DC 
Two examples of the GP39 were built as GP39DC locomotives in June 1970. These used a DC main generator instead of the alternator used on the standard GP39 units, but were otherwise identical. 2 examples of this locomotive model were built for Kennecott Copper Company as 1 and 2, later sold to Copper Basin Railway as 401 and 402.

Successor 
Though the GP39 was not a popular locomotive, EMD later revisited the idea of a turbocharged GP38 with its GP39-2 in 1974.

Original Owners

References

External links

 Sarberenyi, Robert. EMD GP39 Original Owners

GP39
B-B locomotives
Diesel-electric locomotives of the United States
Railway locomotives introduced in 1969
Standard gauge locomotives of the United States